Sergei Yurievich Rodionov (born 3 September 1962) is a Russian football coach and former professional player, who played most of his career as a forward for Spartak Moscow.

Career 
During his years at Spartak (1979–90, 1993–95) and Red Star Saint-Ouen (1990–93) he scored 162 goals.

He was a member of the USSR national team at the 1982 and 1986 World Cups.

From 2015 to 2019, he worked as the general director of Spartak Moscow.

Honours 
 Soviet Top League: 1979, 1987, 1989
 Russian Premier League: 1993, 1994
 Soviet Top League's top goalscorer: 1989 (16 goals)

External links 
 Sergei Rodionov's profile on Spartak's official website. 
 Sergei Rodionov's profile and interview with him 
 Sergei Yuryevich Rodionov - International Appearances

1962 births
Living people
Association football forwards
Soviet footballers
Russian footballers
Russian football managers
FC Asmaral Moscow players
FC Spartak Moscow players
Soviet Top League players
Russian Premier League players
Ligue 2 players
Red Star F.C. players
1982 FIFA World Cup players
1986 FIFA World Cup players
Footballers from Moscow
Soviet Union international footballers
Soviet expatriate footballers
Russian expatriate footballers
Expatriate footballers in France
Soviet expatriate sportspeople in France